Erkki Kämäräinen (13 June 1897 – 14 November 1964) was a Finnish cross-country skier. He competed in the men's 50 kilometre event at the 1924 Winter Olympics.

Cross-country skiing results

Olympic Games

World Championships

References

External links
 

1897 births
1964 deaths
Finnish male cross-country skiers
Olympic cross-country skiers of Finland
Cross-country skiers at the 1924 Winter Olympics
People from Sotkamo
Sportspeople from Kainuu